Meadowbank Aerodrome  is an aerodrome located  northeast of Meadowbank Gold Mine, Nunavut, Canada.

Airlines and destinations

References 

Registered aerodromes in the Kivalliq Region